The Parisi were a British Celtic tribe located somewhere within the present-day East Riding of Yorkshire, in England, known from a single brief reference by Ptolemy in his Geographica of about AD 150.  Many writers have connected them with the archaeological Arras culture and some with the more widely known Parisii of Gaul.

Historical sources and archaeology

The Parisi are known from a description in Ptolemy's Geographica (Geographica II, 3, 10) which locates them to near Opportunum Sinus ("Good harbour"). Ptolemy is presumed never to have visited Roman Britain, compiling his work from existing sources, probably in Alexandria. 

The tribe is inferred to have been surrounded by the Brigantes, and with the Coritani south of them across the Humber. Ptolemy mentions the Parisi in association with Petvaria, a town thought to be located close to Brough, East Riding of Yorkshire. Ptolemy also mentions a promontory Promontarium Ocellum, which may be either Spurn Head or Flamborough Head.

The translation and interpretation of Ptolemy's work has not been consistent over time, with differing interpretations creating potential contradictions in the spatial relationship between Opportunum Sinus and Petuaria. A more recent interpretation (2005) places both the Parisi  and Petuaria on the Opportunum Sinus which leads to the common interpretation of Opportunum Sinus to be impossible geographically – an alternative feature – the inlet near Brough to Walling Fen has been suggested. Brough/Petuaria also had a harbour in Roman times (further inland than the current Brough Haven) which has long since silted up, further supporting this interpretation.

The Parisi are also mentioned in the forgery De Situ Britanniae originally credited to Richard of Cirencester (14th century AD): the Parisi's towns supposedly included Petuaria and a place Portus Felix, the locations of which were uncertain, and subject to speculation in the 19th century.

Evidence for link with continental tribes
Burials in East Yorkshire dating from the pre-Roman Iron Age are distinguished as those of the Arras Culture, and show differences from surrounding areas, generally lacking grave goods, but chariot burials and burials with swords are known, but are similar (chariot burials) to those ascribed to the La Tène culture of areas of western and central Europe, giving a potential link to the similarly named Parisii of Gaul.

Etymology
The origin of the name is uncertain; Celticists John T. Koch and Raimund Karl propose a Celtic linguistic origin, meaning "the commanders", similar to the Welsh verb peri (to cause, command or have done, from Proto-Celtic *kwer-). Linguist Eric Hamp also links the name to this verb and suggests a meaning of "fighters". Xavier Delamarre prefers to link the ethnic name to the P-Celtic root *pario- "cauldron" and translates Parisi as "they of the cauldrons" (taking their name after a distinctive type of vessel used by the Iron Age Celts).

Notes

References

Sources

Further reading

External links

Ancient peoples
Celtic Britons
History of the East Riding of Yorkshire
Archaeology of the East Riding of Yorkshire
Historical Celtic peoples